Cyra (British name) is a feminine given name and surname.

People with the name include:
 Saint Cyra, early Irish abbess.
 Cyra McFadden (born 1937), American writer
 Cyra Noavek, character from Veronica Roth's Carve the Mark
 Adam Cyra (born 1949), Polish historian

Feminine given names